The James Giddens House is a property in Thompsons Station, Tennessee, United States, that dates from c.1900 and that was listed on the National Register of Historic Places in 1988. It has also been known as Moss Side Farm. It includes Classical Revival architecture.

The NRHP-eligibility of the property was covered in a 1988 study of Williamson County historical resources.

References

Houses completed in 1900
Houses in Williamson County, Tennessee
Houses on the National Register of Historic Places in Tennessee
Neoclassical architecture in Tennessee
National Register of Historic Places in Williamson County, Tennessee